Săliștea is a commune in Alba County, Romania.

Săliştea may also refer to:

Săliştea, a village in Uda Commune, Argeș County, Romania
Săliştea Nouă, a village in Baciu Commune, Cluj County, Romania
Săliştea Veche, a village in Chinteni Commune, Cluj County, Romania
Siliștea, Constanța, a village in Constanta County, +1Romania
Săliștea de Sus, a town in Maramureș County, Romania
Săliştea, a village in Malaia Commune, Vâlcea County, Romania
Săliştea, a village in Râmnicu Vâlcea city, Vâlcea County, Romania

See also
Sălişte (disambiguation)